The 2021–22 Northern Iowa Panthers women's basketball team represented the University of Northern Iowa during the 2021–22 NCAA Division I women's basketball season. The Panthers were led by head coach Tanya Warren in her fifteenth season, and played their home games at the McLeod Center as a member of the Missouri Valley Conference.

Previous season
The Panthers finished the 2020–21 season with a 17–13 record, including 11–7 in Missouri Valley Conference play. They received a bid to the 2021 Women's National Invitation Tournament, where they advanced to the Final Four.

Offseason

Departures

2021 recruiting class

Roster

Schedule and results

|-
!colspan=9 style=| Exhibition

|-
!colspan=9 style=| Non-conference regular season

|-
!colspan=9 style=| Missouri Valley Conference regular season

|-
!colspan=9 style=| MVC Tournament

|-
!colspan=9 style=| Women's National Invitation Tournament

References

Northern Iowa
Northern Iowa Panthers women's basketball seasons
Iowa
Northern Iowa
Northern Iowa